Taw9eel.com (Tawseel General Trading W.L.L.) is a Kuwait-based electronic commerce company which is the biggest online retailer in Kuwait. Tawseel, owns and operates several websites. The company and main website name comes from the Arabic language, where the Arabic word Tawseel, (Arabic:توصيل) translates to the word delivery in the English language.

History
Taw9eel.com went online in 2006 Sheeel.com sold its first deal on January 19, 2011.

Awards

Tawseel won the Kuwait e-Awards in two consecutive years, 2010 and 2011. The Kuwait e-Awards is sponsored by the Kuwait Foundation for the Advancement of Sciences (KFAS), and is arranged in cooperation with the World Summit Award.
In 2010, Tawseel won first place in the Kuwait e-Awards for Taw9eel.com. In 2011, Tawseel was again awarded first place in the Kuwait e-Awards under the e-commerce category for its website Sheeel.com, only three months after launch.

Business

Tawseel sells similar product lines through two websites. Taw9eel.com uses as more traditional e-commerce website sales model while Sheeel.com uses a deal-of-the-day sales model. Tawseel product lines include groceries, consumer electronics, kitchen items, tools, toys & games, baby products, special apparel, sporting goods, health-care items, books, beauty products, and groceries.
The website marketing efforts is focused on driving traffic using social media outlets such as Twitter and Facebook. Both Tawseel websites are viewable via a normal website using desktop browser and a Webapp using Smartphones.

Geographic markets

Taw9eel.com serves customers only in the State of Kuwait.

Sheeel.com serves only in Kuwait.

References

External links

 Taw9eel main website

Arabic-language websites
Online retailers of Kuwait
Retail companies established in 2006
Internet properties established in 2006
Kuwaiti companies established in 2006